Attorney General Cohen may refer to:

Henry Cohen (politician) (1872–1942), Attorney-General of Victoria
Herbert B. Cohen (1900–1970), Attorney General of Pennsylvania
Richard S. Cohen (1937–1998), Attorney General of Maine

See also
Haim Cohn (1911–2002), Attorney General of Israel